Newington College is a multi-campus independent Uniting Church single-sex and co-educational early learning, primary and secondary day and boarding school for boys, located in Stanmore, an inner-western suburb of Sydney, New South Wales, Australia. Established in 1863 at Newington House, Silverwater, the college celebrated its sesquicentenary in 2013. The college is open to boys of all faiths and denominations. Newington has been governed by an Act of Parliament since 1922.

Newington has two preparatory schools, Wyvern House in Cambridge Street, Stanmore, and a school at Lindfield on Sydney's Upper North Shore. Newington currently caters for approximately 2,000 students from Year K to Year 12. Edmund Webb House, a boarding facility, is in Cambridge Street, Stanmore. The Robert Glasson Memorial Boat Shed is on the Parramatta River at Abbotsford and contains a boarding facility for thirty boys.

, Newington has 16 houses, expanded from eight houses. The college is a member of the Association of Heads of Independent Schools of Australia (AHISA), the Junior School Heads Association of Australia (JSHAA), the Australian Boarding Schools' Association, and is a founding member of the Athletic Association of the Great Public Schools of New South Wales (AAGPS).

The college prepares students for the International Baccalaureate Diploma Programme and the NSW Higher School Certificate.

History

Early history
The Reverend John Manton proposed that a collegiate institute, 'decidedly Wesleyan in character', be founded in Sydney and that the school 'be open to the sons of parents of all religious denominations'. On 16 July 1863, the Wesleyan Collegiate Institute opened with 16 boys and a small number of theological students. As no suitable buildings were available in Sydney at the time, Newington House, the centrepiece of John Blaxland's  estate at Silverwater, was leased.

Newington College, as the school soon became known, prospered during its time on the Parramatta River and in 1869 was the first Australian school to play rugby football (against the University of Sydney), and soon after was the first school in Australia to hold an athletics carnival.  In 1869, the Newington College Cadet Corps was formally incorporated by the Governor of New South Wales, Somerset Lowry-Corry, 4th Earl Belmore. It is the oldest continuous corps in the Australian Army Cadets.

Expanding student numbers meant that more extensive premises closer to the city were required. A bequest by John Jones of land at Stanmore saw the College move to the newly fashionable inner-city suburbs. A grand stone edifice was designed by Thomas Rowe and was described by Morton Herman, an architectural historian, as 'an almost perfect example of scholastic Gothic Revival architecture'. The Thomas Rowe-designed Founder's Building, including its interior and surrounding grounds, are listed on the heritage register of the former Marrickville Council. Thomas Wran completed substantial architectural sculpture commissions on the capitals of the stone colonnade of the building. Earth-moving work began on the site in 1876 and by May 1878 the building had reached first floor height. A public ceremony was held and six commemorative stones were laid. Amongst the six given the honour of laying the stones were Sir George Wigram Allen , the philanthropist who was Speaker of the New South Wales Legislative Assembly. He had lent A£12,000 for the new buildings at Stanmore and later endowed the Wigram Allen Scholarship for boys proceeding to matriculation. The formal opening of the new school building was by Sir George on 18 January 1881. By resolution of the College Council, the name Newington College was perpetuated on the new site. Seventy school and theological students migrated from Silverwater to Stanmore.

A gymnasium was built in 1890, and a swimming pool was opened in 1894 however both have been replaced by a multi-court gymnasium and indoor swimming pool.

20th century
Newington ceased its connection to theological training in 1914, when the Wesleyan Theological Institution moved to the newly founded Leigh College at Strathfield South. In 1921, a stone war memorial, designed by Old Newingtonian William Hardy Wilson, was opened in memory of those old boys who had paid the supreme sacrifice in World War I. A separate preparatory school was opened in 1921, after a bequest by Sir Samuel McCaughey. It became known as Wyvern House in 1938, when a new building was opened by Old Newingtonian Sir Percival Halse Rogers.

In 1925, a rowing facility was built at Abbotsford, and in 1957 another preparatory school was founded on the North Shore – first at Killara, and subsequently relocated to Lindfield. Since the World War II, the College buildings and facilities expanded significantly under the ONU Honorary Architects Panel and the convenorship of Hedley Norman Carr.

During the Headmastership of Tony Rae, the Senior Block (1972) and Resources Centre Library (1975) and Chapel were opened. A new Physical Education Centre was opened by Old Newingtonian Nick Farr-Jones , and a new boatshed at Abbotsford were two of the most important property additions. In 1998, while Michael Smee was Headmaster, Wyvern House moved to a separate campus in Cambridge Street, Stanmore. The former Wyvern House building was then renovated and renamed the Le Couteur Wing in memory of former Headmaster Philip Le Couteur. In 2007 Newington acquired the Concordia Club (the former German cultural club) on Stanmore Road for 3.51 million. , Le Couteur was re-renovated and visual arts classes began to occupy the first floor with languages and learning enhancement classes held on level two.

21st century
During 2006, the press reported on an industrial relations dispute at Newington in which then Headmaster David Scott planned to force staff to re-apply for their jobs in a restructure that would also reduce their holidays. Scott said that 'The action was taken after a comprehensive review of the school and had nothing to do with the federal government's Work Choices reforms' The Sydney Morning Herald reported that Scott believed that the Independent Education Union was being mischievous 'at best', or using an 'outright and deliberate lie' in suggesting the restructure was linked to workplace legislation. Following a meeting between the Union and Newington College, Scott agreed to not declare senior staff positions vacant and the school continued to negotiate collective arrangements covering salary and working conditions for staff.

David Mulford was appointed Headmaster in 2009 and served in that role until retiring in 2018. In 2012, the Nesbit Wing named in honour of Robert H. Nesbitt, was built prior to the College centenary in 1963 and was refurbished and extended to encompass the Technology Centre. Between 2009 and 2012 Newington spent 78 million on capital works; in 2012 33.7 million was outlaid on infrastructure alone. In 2013 the College celebrated its sesquicentenary with the opening of two new buildings honouring two former Headmasters – The Lawrence Pyke Science Centre and The Tony Rae Resources Centre Library. This development was awarded the Master Builders Association of New South Wales's Excellence in Construction Award and was funded by donations and parent fees. In November 2013, the PE Centre was renamed the Taylor Sports Centre in honour of Old Newingtonian cricket and rugby union international Johnny Taylor. The naming was performed by Old Newingtonian Olympic rower and coach Michael Morgan .

On 18 July 2016, in commemoration of the sesquicentenary of Newington College's brother school Tupou College, the reigning monarch of the Kingdom of Tonga King Tupou VI and his wife Queen Consort Nanasipau'u visited the College to open the Tupou College Centre. The centre houses specialist teaching spaces and a health centre.

The Duckmanton Drama Centre was named in honour of Sir Talbot Duckmanton  and opened on 31 July 2017. Sir Talbot served on the Newington College Council from 1964 until 1978 and was Chairman of the Council Executive Committee for five years.

College Council
The Newington College Council Act allows for the appointment of up to 24 members of the council: nine clerical appointments; nine lay appointments; and six members nominated by the Old Newingtonians Union (ONU).

Chairman of the Council Executive Committee

College staff

Presidents and headmasters
From its founding in 1863 until 1900, Newington had a system of dual control with a president (who was an ordained minister) and a headmaster. As an ordained minister, Charles Prescott assumed both roles on his appointment in 1900 and, on his retirement in 1931, the role of President was abolished.

Presidents

Headmasters

Notable masters
The long service of masters at Newington College is recognised in a number of ways. In 1955 a marble commemorative plaque was set in the north-western wall of the Prescott Hall to commemorate the work of three very long serving staff members and their Head, with the inscription:

These masters are further recognised by the naming of the Buchanan Oval, Ben Jarvie Staff Common Room and Cortis Jones Lecture Theatre. Another long-serving master of the first half of the 20th century was Colonel Albert Douglas Arthur (1889–1949). In 1951 the college library was housed in a new room and renamed the A.D. Arthur Memorial Library in his honour. The library moved into the Nesbitt Wing upon its completion and when it moved again into Prescott Hall an adjoining study room was named the A.D. Arthur Annex. Arthur's name has not been connected with the college library since the 1970s but his portrait in oils still hangs in the Ben Jarvie Common Room. In 2014, past masters Phil Davis OAM and Robert Buntine were honoured with rooms in the AJ Rae Resource and Library Centre being named after them. Davis is the college's third-longest serving master (1951–2000), after Cortis Jones and Jarvie, and Buntine was the Deputy Headmaster during the headship of Tony Rae.

Staff members notable in the wider community include the following:

Students

Leaders
Since 1898, the Senior Prefect has been the captain of the school. The first student to hold that position was Sandy Phillips. In 2012, the Senior Prefect was Michael Cameron, whose father, Bruce Cameron, was Senior Prefect in 1974 and grandfather, Doug Cameron, was Senior Prefect in 1946. Since 1961 there has been a Deputy Senior Prefect and from 1991 it has been the custom to appoint two Deputies. A Senior Boarder Prefect has been appointed since 1932 when Philip Le Couteur, as Headmaster, instituted a House System. The Houses, eight in total, are led by a House Captain and a House Vice-Captain, or two. Until 1988, a select number of students were appointed as Prefect. Since that time, it has been the practice in Term 4 to offer all Year 11 boys the position of House Prefect and at the end of Year 12 to confirm as School Prefect all those judged to have discharged their duties in an exemplary manner. In 1950 and 1951, under the Headship of Mervyn Austin, Probationer Prefects were appointed and from 1953 until 1967 they were known as Sub-Prefects. That title was again used from 1983 until the current system of leaders was started in 1988. In one year only, 1971 during the Acting Headship of Owen Dudley, Monitors were appointed.

Dux
The title of Dux of the college is awarded to the best academic student each year in the senior form. Since 1865 that has been the Upper Sixth, Sixth Form and now Year 12. The first Dux announced was Andrew Houison during the early years at Newington House. From 1881, the Dux received the Schofield Scholarship (after Schofield's donation of £1,000 to the College) and since 1924 the Halse Rogers Prize (which was endowed by William and Elizabeth Halse Rogers). In more recent years these have been awarded jointly as the Schofield and Halse Rogers Prizes. Winners names were from 1881 inscribed on boards in the Prescott Hall but since 1976 the board has been in the Centenary Hall. Duces of Newington have included: Cecil Purser shared with James Ramsay (1881); George Abbott (1882); Harry Wolstenholme (1885); Herbert Curlewis (1886); William Parker (1887); Frederick Pratt (1888); John Halliday (1889), when he was known as Charles Halliday; David Edwards (1890); Edwin Hall (1891); Ernest Warren (1892); Harold Curlewis (1893); Walter Woolnough (1894); George Harker (1895); Leslie Allen (1899); Percival Halse Rogers (1900); Lindsay Dey (1904); Carleton Allen shared with Rupert Hollaway (1905); James McKern (1906); Ronald Aston shared with Henry Darke (1916); William Morrow (1921); Walter Bryan Ward shared with Philip Harrison (1924); Keith Jones (1927); Talbot Duckmanton (1937); John Veevers (1947); John Turtle (1953); Bob Baxt (1955); John Pyke (1957); Warwick Cathro (1964); and Patrick Cook shared with David Emery and Philip Neal (1967). David Murray (1909) and Roxy Muir (1913) died during World War I. Harold Hunt was Dux in 1884 and his son, Harold Hunt, was Dux in 1920. The Thomas family have three generations of Duces of Newington: Noel Thomas (1930); Rod Thomas (1960); and Peter Thomas (1988).

Old Boys' Prize
The Old Boys' Prize is the most senior of the citizenship prizes awarded at Newington and is presented for scholarship, sportsmanship and moral qualities. Loyalty and leadership are equally weighed in this award. It was first awarded in 1904 and shared by Thomas Gale and Oliver Woodward. It has been awarded annually since then and recipients have included: Carleton Allen (1905); Bryan Ward (1924) shared with Jonathon Joyce; John Lawes (1925) shared with Richard Hay; Denis Cowper (1926) shared with Den Joyce; Bym Porter (1927) shared with Arthur Parton; George Wright (1935); Marshall Hatch (1950); Graham Colditz (1972); and Stephen Rae (1979). For four years in a row the prize was awarded to students who were to serve and die in World War I: David Murray (1910); Morven Nolan (1911); Clifford Holliday (1912); and Roxy Muir (1913). The Old Boys Prize was not awarded the following year (1914).

Campuses

Newington College is situated over three suburban campuses, located in Stanmore and Lindfield:

Secondary school
The secondary campus is located in Stanmore, in Sydney's inner-west. The student body consists of approximately 50 boarders and 1,700-day students from Years 7 to 12. Newington boarders come from country and city, interstate and overseas. Day students are drawn from all over the Sydney greater metropolitan area.

Wyvern House preparatory school

Newington has educated primary school (Kindergarten to Year 6) aged boys since 1863. In 1938 Wyvern House opened in a separate school building on the Stanmore campus and accepted its first students in 1939. Wyvern moved to new premises in Cambridge Street, Stanmore, a few minutes' walk from the secondary school, in 1998. It has approximately 480 students – all day students. There are two classes in each of Years K to 2, three classes in Years 3 to 4 and four classes in Years 5 to 6. The Head of Wyvern House is Ian Holden.

Lindfield preparatory school
The Newington College Preparatory School was established initially at Killara (1957) and later at Lindfield (1967), in response to requests from Old Newingtonians that a preparatory school be established on the North Shore of Sydney. The Head of Newington College, Lindfield, is Ben Barrington-Higgs. It is a single-stream school, with approximately 160 students from Kindergarten to Year 6 and is set in a bushland location where the Students are constantly in touch with nature. The school features a basketball/tennis court, climbing gym areas, swimming pool and connects to the bush trails of Swain Gardens. Each classroom includes effective information communication technology tools. Classrooms have dedicated computer and wet areas, and bag storage areas. There are special facilities for music, art and French. A tuckshop operates three days a week. The campus has just undergone a major redevelopment of classrooms and the addition of a new hall, library and visual arts room. Students in Years 3–6 compete in the Independent Primary School Heads of Australia (IPSHA) Competition held on Saturday mornings. Every student competes in a summer (basketball or cricket) or winter sport (rugby or soccer). Newington's preparatory schools combine for annual carnivals in swimming, athletics and cross country.

Houses
The house system at Newington was founded in the 1930s and in 2021 eight new houses were added. Originally houses were named after presidents and headmasters but the names now honour Old Newingtonians and important women in the history of the school.

The house system at Wyvern House was founded in 1938 and honours early Headmasters:
Coates
Joseph Coates was one of Newington’s first teachers and served as Head Master from 1877 to 1883. He founded the Cadets Corps and the sports of rugby and shooting at the school. In 1883 he was appointed as the first headmaster of Sydney Boys High School. 

Williams
William Henry Williams was Newington’s Head Master from 1884 to 1892. The most academically accomplished Head at that time, he broadened the curriculum in the humanities and sciences and introduced a stream of ‘modern’ subjects. 

Lucas
Arthur Henry Shakespeare Lucas was Newington’s Head Master from 1893 to 1898. A noted biologist and gifted teacher and administrator, he further improved the school’s academic reputation. He subsequently taught and served as Headmaster at Sydney Grammar School. 

Howe
Dr Michael C Howe was Newington’s Head Master from 1869 to 1877. A distinguished classics scholar and popular teacher, he promoted academic rigour and oversaw Newington’s remarkable early successes in the public examinations and university admissions.

When Newington founded a Prep School at Killara two houses were established and those continue today at the Prep School at Lindfield. They were named in honour of English schools with a Weslyan tradition:
Kingswood
The Kingswood School was founded in Bath, England, in 1748 by John Wesley, the founder of Methodism, and is the oldest Methodist school in the world. Besides it being a great Methodist educational institution, and an inspiration for Newington’s founders, four of the significant figures in Newington’s history — Moulton, Fletcher, Lucas and Prescott were educated at Kingswoo School.

Rydal
Rydal Mount later Rydal School and now Rydal Penrhos was founded at Colwyn Bay, North Wales, in 1885, and is the only Methodist school in Wales. Founded as a boys’ boarding school, it started admitting girls in the 1960s and merged with a girls’ school, Penrhos College, in 1999.

War memorials
The grounds and buildings of Newington College contain numerous war memorials:

Classrooms and science building
Work began in October 1952 on the War Memorial Classroom Block and the Old Boy benefactor W. R. Glasson unveiled the foundation stone. In June 1953 the building was opened by Colonel Thomas Millner . The War Memorial Science Building was opened in July 1955 by Sir Iven Mackay   when he unveiled a stone memorial wall with the following inscription:

Johnson Oval
Gunner Jack Johnson, an Old Newingtonian, died of wounds on a Belgian battlefield in 1917 and in his memory, his parents, Frank and Sarah Johnson, provided £1,100 for the college to level part of the existing playing fields. This provided a rugby union ground of full size, and was named the Johnson Oval. At the corners brick retaining walls, to a design by Arthur Anderson, protected the steep banks.
 
Eight other memorials at Newington are recorded on the New South Wales Government's Register of War Memorials in New South Wales.

Memorial to the Dead 1914–1918

The sandstone Memorial to the Dead was designed by the Old Newingtonian architect William Hardy Wilson and is now sited between the Centenary Hall and the chapel. It was originally placed in a grove of trees to the north of the Founders Wing but was moved to its present location in the early 1960s to make way for the construction of the Centenary Hall which was opened in 1963. The memorial comprises a semi-circular wall and seat, with pillars surmounted by white stone urns at either end and a column with a sundial stands at the centre. The inscription on the wall reads: 1914 – To Our Beloved Dead – 1918 and the inscription on the sundial reads: Time dims not their sacrifice. The memorial was dedicated on 11 May 1922 by the Governor General of Australia and the Old Newingtonian poet Leslie Holdsworth Allen wrote a poem, To our beloved dead, in memory of the occasion.

Gallipoli Lone Pine Memorial
Commemorating Prisoners of War during World War I, this tree comes from a seedling propagated from a pine cone brought home from Gallipoli by an Australian soldier. The tree stands in a triangular area of grass formed by the merging of the Cowlishaw Drive and the War Memorial Drive. A bronze commemorative plaque on a stone plinth has the following inscription: 
The Gallipoli Lone Pine – During the 1914–1918 Great War, Australian and New Zealand forces landed at Gallipoli on 25 April 1915 to attack Turkish forces. Eight months later they withdrew. One significant battle occurred on the ridge where a lone pine stood. ANZAC forces finally occupied the Turkish position, but with the tragic loss of 2,227 men. Turkish losses were around 5,000. During the withdrawal from ANZAC Cove, an Australian soldier picked up a pine cone and brought it home, where the seeds were propagated. Since 1933, when the pines became of good size and yielded more seedlings, Legacy arranged for pine trees to be distributed to schools and interested groups to help keep the memory of the Gallipoli Lone Pine alive.

Chapel Memorial Tablets

Twenty four brass plaques were hung in Prescott Hall as memorials to individual Old Newingtonians who died during World War I. Further plaques were added after World War II but they were all removed when the hall was renovated in 1979. They were then placed on the first floor balcony of the War Memorial Classroom Block. They were later placed in the archives collection. In 1995 they were restored and repositioned in the chapel's glass ambulatory overlooking the 1914–1918 Memorial to the Dead. Included amongst these plaques is one in memory of William Tasker (15 October 1891 – 9 August 1918) who was a World War I soldier who had been a national representative rugby union player making six Test appearances for the Wallabies.

War Memorial Driveway
In 1936 the War Memorial Drive was planted with 75 poplars, each with a cross at the foot and a plaque honouring individual Old Newingtonians who died during World War II. The trees were replaced by a new avenue of trees in 1966 and the plaques were replaced by a tablet on a plinth with the inscription: Lest We Forget – This plaque was dedicated on 24 September 1966, to mark the planting of trees alongside the War Memorial Drive by the Old Newingtonians' Union to restore those originally planted by the Union on 29 February 1936. By this act Old Newingtonians remember those Old Boys who gave their lives in the service of God, King and Country, and whose names are recorded on the War Memorial of the School. Fifty of the original plaques remain in the archives collection. In 1979 the War Memorial Drive was realigned and replanted and the 1966 plinth was moved to the Millner Gates end of the drive.

Boer War Honour Roll
A bronze tablet recording the names of 44 Old Newingtonians who served in the Boer War hangs in Prescott Hall in the Founders Wing. It is set in a Gothic frame of columns with a plinth and cornice. The inscription reads: Floreat Newingtonia – Erected by Old Boys of Newington College in honour of Newingtonians who fought for the Empire in South Africa 1899–1902. The Memorial was designed by Old Newingtonian architects Henry Budden and William Hardy Wilson and was dedicated on 15 December 1903.

World War I Honour Roll

Over six hundred Old Newingtonians enlisted during World War I and the loss of life was appalling. By war's end, 109 Old Boys had died for God, King and Country. Prior to 1920 the walls of the vestibule at the entrance to the Founders Wing had been hung with sporting teams photographs. In 1921 this space was transformed by the installation of white marble tablets, encased in Queensland maple, upon which were inscribed the names of Old Boys who had served. Those who had made the supreme sacrifice are listed on the central panels below the words: These Nobly Strining, Nobly Fell. With a black and white marble floor and stained glass door panels this space takes on the feel of a small chapel.

World War II Honour Roll

A wall of brass and enamel panels in the Centenary Hall foyer records the names of the 814 Old Newingtonians who served in Australia's armed forces in World War II. The inscription reads: Honour Roll of Old Newingtonians World War II 1939–1945. This honour roll was dedicated on Anzac Day 2009 by Old Newingtonian Major General Sandy Pearson  and replaces a roll in the same position that was unveiled by Sir William Morrow   in 1966.

Post-World War II Honour Roll
This wooden honour board records the names of 45 Old Newingtonians who served in Australia's armed forces in conflicts post-World War II and is on the southern wall of the Centenary Hall foyer. It is inscribed: In every generation good men must defend what they believe to be right and Newington remembers with pride her sons who served their sovereign and country in the cause of liberty in international conflicts from 1948 to 1973. It commemorates service in the Korean War, Malayan Emergency, Malaysian-Indonesian Confrontation and Vietnam War.

War memorial prizes
The following are presented in honour of Old Newingtoninans who made the supreme sacrifice:

Dunster Allen Trophy – awarded for Open Rifle Shooting. Donated by his family in memory of Geoffrey Dunster Allen who died in 1918 when his Sopwith Camel crashed near Minchinhampton whilst on training duties during World War I. Allen was at Newington 1911–1914.
Holliday Scholarship – awarded to the Dux of Year Nine. Donated by his parents in memory of Clifford Dawson "Bob" Holliday who was killed in action in France in 1916 during World War I. This prize was originally awarded for scriptural knowledge in the Sixth Form. Holiday was at Newington 1905–1914.
David Jacobs Trophy – awarded to the most successful non-competition Rugby Union team above the Under 13s. Donated by his brothers in memory of David Jacobs who was killed during a flying battle over the Timor Sea in 1942 during World War II. Jacobs was at Newington 1933–1935.
Harry Kershaw Prize – awarded to the Best All-Round Sportsman. Donated by his parents in memory of Henry "Harry" Burton Kershaw who was killed during a flying battle over New Guinea in 1943 during World War II. Kershaw was at Newington 1922–1930.
Jack Thorncraft Trophy – awarded for Loyalty and Service to the college. Donated by M A Dawes in memory of Jack William Herbert Thorncraft who died in 1942 during World War II. Thorncraft was at Newington 1935–1937.
Warry Cup – awarded to the Senior Athletics Champion. Donated by his parents in memory of Victor Thomas Symes Warry who was killed in action in France in 1915 during World War II. Warry was at Newington 1912–1914.
Stretton Waterhouse Memorial Prize – awarded to the Dux of Year Ten. Donated by Gustavus Athol Waterhouse in memory of her son, Stretton Gustavus John Waterhouse who was killed in action in New Guinea in 1943 during WW II. Waterhouse was at Newington 1929–1931.

Curriculum
The school teaches the core curriculum outlined by the NSW Board of Studies (BOS) between Kindergarten and Year 8. In addition to this curriculum, the students study one major language other than English. From Years 9 to 12, students adhere to the Board of Studies curriculum standards that all NSW schools follow.

Newington became an International Baccalaureate (IB) World School in May 2007, and from 2008 has offered the IB Diploma to Year 11 students, as an alternative to the NSW Higher School Certificate (HSC).

Co-curriculum

Newington students may participate in the following co-curricular activities:
 Cadets – The Newington College Cadet Corps (now Unit) was founded in 1869 and pre-dates the Australian Army. Activities include abseiling, archery, bushcraft, canoeing, drill, first aid, lifesaving, mapping, orienteering and radio operation. There is also a service band and service orchestra.
 Newington Challenge – The scheme teaches the skills needed to survive in the bush including first aid, orienteering and camp craft. Year 10 there are activities including: archery, self-defence and indoor climbing. There are also two camps per year.
 The Duke of Edinburgh's Award – This scheme is offered either as a stand-alone activity, as part of cadets or Newington Challenge.
 Music – Founders Concert is Newington's major music performance annually and joint choral concerts are held with MLC School. The Symphonic Winds group compete in public festivals and challenges and the Chapel Choir provide music year long at house services and evensong. All group participate in the GPS Music Festival.
Drama – Newington produces a Musical Theatre every two years, as well as both a Senior and Middle School Production every year. Newington also is involved in Theatresports, hosting the Inner West Cup annually, as well as competing in Impro Australia's Theatresports Schools Competition.
 Sport – Newington is one of the nine members of the Athletic Association of the Great Public Schools of New South Wales (GPS) and participates in all GPS sporting competitions as well as several non-GPS or traditional sports. Newington students may participate in a variety of sports including: Athletics, Australian Football, Basketball, Cricket, Cross Country, Fencing, Full Bore Rifle Shooting, Judo, Rowing, Rugby Union, Small Bore Rifle Shooting, Soccer, Swimming, Tennis, Volleyball and Water Polo.

Rowing
Newington has a history of producing rowers, coxswains, and coaches who have gone on to represent NSW and Australia in rowing. The rowing program has produced many Olympic and World Championships rowers including: James Chapman (1992–1997), 2012 Summer Olympics rowing silver medalist; Tom Chessell, 1952 Summer Olympics rowing Bronze Medallist; Sam Hardy 2019 World Rowing Championships Bronze medalist; Rob Jahrling 2000 Summer Olympics rowing Silver Medallist; Fred Kirkham 1956 Summer Olympics rowing Bronze Medallist; Matthew Long 2000 Summer Olympics rowing Bronze Medallist; Michael Morgan 1968 Summer Olympics rowing Silver Medallist; Geoff Stewart 2000 & 2004 Summer Olympics dual rowing Bronze Medallist; James Stewart 2000 & 2004 Summer Olympics dual rowing Bronze Medallist; Stephen Stewart 2004 Summer Olympics rowing Bronze Medallist and Richard Wearne World Rowing Championships Silver & Bronze Medallist. Newington has produced several Australian representatives at senior, Under 23 and Junior levels. At 1996, 2000 and 2004 Olympics, there were four old boys in each of those Olympic Rowing teams.

The Newingtonian
The school annual of Newington College is called The Newingtonian and dates to the early 1880s. Three hand-written news sheets with the title The Newingtonian we're circulated in 1883 but the first printed issue of the magazine was published in June 1884. The aim of its founding editors was ‘...to place on record the simple annals of boyhood'. A quotation from the Latin poet Horace — Memor Puertiæ, translated as 'remembering boyhood' — served as The Newingtonian's motto until 1951. This briefly reappeared on the 1971 issues. The magazine was initially published as a quarterly, with an index for every twelve issues. From 1919 until 1940 The Newingtonian appeared three times a year and then was published twice a year until 1972 when it first appeared as an annual. The size changed to its present format in 1971. From its early days the magazine was setting the agenda for change in the college and upon the arrival of James Egan Moulton as president an 1894 issue called for a school song. The first photograph appeared in 1896 of the Rugby Union1st XV and the magazine has been in full colour since the 1980s. As with other traditional school magazines, The Newingtonian has carried reports of major events, of academic and sporting achievement, of co-curricular activities and of many other aspects of the school's day-to-day life. Even before the founding of the Old Newingtonians' Union in 1895, the magazine has profiled the achievements of alumni. During the South African and World Wars records of Old Newingtonians armed service were published. Between 1995 and 2000 a separate publication of the same format known as The Old Newingtonian was published by the college.

School song 
Dear Newingtonia

Gallery
Glasson Pavilion and Old Chapel Drama Centre

Dixon Gates, Stanmore Road fence, Sevington tennis courts and Deputy Headmaster's residence.

Founders, the tower and Prescott Hall

Alumni

Alumni of Newington College are known as Old Newingtonians and may elect to join the college's alumni association, the Old Newingtonians' Union. The Union was founded in 1895, with James Egan Moulton, the Newington College President, as its inaugural President and Sir Thomas Bavin as secretary. As stated in its constitution, the aims of the ONU are to:

The school's bi-annual publication Newington News is sent to all old boys whose current addresses are known to the Union. The Union previously published directories of Old Newingtonians at five yearly intervals however that publication has been superseded by an on-line directory.

Affiliated organisations of the Union are: Wyvern Cricket Club, playing in the Sydney Suburban Competition; Lodge Wyvern, a Masonic Lodge; and The 70 Club, a luncheon club for senior Old boys. The Old Newingtonians' Union is a member of the GPS Old Boys Unions' Council.

Presidents of the Union are now normally elected for three one-year terms and are supported by a council. The immediate past president is Alex Baykitch  (Class of 1982). The council comprises a treasurer, a secretary and his assistant, councillors, metropolitan vice-presidents, regional vice-presidents, and past presidents. Council member must be old boys of the college. During the college's centenary Sir Keith Jones was president of the Union (1963 & 1964) and in the centenary year of the Union His Honour Judge Fred Kirkham was president (1995 & 1996). The immediate past Chairman of Newington College Council, The Hon. Justice Angus Talbot, has also served as president (1997 & 1998). Other notable presidents of the Union include The Hon. Samuel Moore MLA (1896, 1898, 1904 & 1916), Arthur Lucas (1897); Cecil Purser (1899); George Abbott (1901); The Hon. William Robson MLC (1902 & 1905); William Horner Fletcher (1903), Percy Colquhoun MLA (1918 & 1919), Henry Budden  (1920), Lt Col Alfred Warden   (1923 & 1924); Carl Glasgow MLA (1929 & 1930); Col Tom Millner  (1937, 1938, 1945 & 1946); Garth Barraclough  (1948 & 1949), The Hon. Richard Thompson MLC (1952 & 1954), Alex Rigby  (1959 & 1960), and Roger Davidson  (1972 & 1973).

Notable Old Newingtonians
For notable Old Newingtonians see:

See also

 Lawrence Campbell Oratory Competition
 List of boarding schools in Australia
 List of non-government schools in New South Wales
 Leigh College
 Wesleyan Theological Institution
 Wyvern House

References

External links
 Newington College website

 
Educational institutions established in 1863
1863 establishments in Australia
Former Methodist schools in Australia
Boarding schools in New South Wales
Private primary schools in Sydney
Boys' schools in New South Wales
Junior School Heads Association of Australia Member Schools
International Baccalaureate schools in Australia
Gothic Revival architecture in Sydney
Thomas Rowe buildings
Stanmore, New South Wales
Lindfield, New South Wales
Athletic Association of the Great Public Schools of New South Wales
Private secondary schools in Sydney
Uniting Church schools in Australia